Natalya Serbinenko (née Sharipova; born 27 January 1959) is a Ukrainian former racewalker. She competed six times at the IAAF World Race Walking Cup, with her best result coming in 1983, where she was silver medallist behind Xu Yongjiu of China. With four consecutive appearances from 1981 to 1989, she was the most capped athlete for the Soviet Union ever at that competition. She represented Ukraine in her last appearance at the tournament in 1993.

At the first ever women's race walk at the Summer Universiade in 1985 she took a bronze medal, sharing the podium with fellow Soviet Aleksandra Grigoryeva and Yan Hong of China. At national level she won once at the Soviet Athletics Championships (1983) and once at the Ukrainian Athletics Championships (1993).

Serbinenko was highly ranked during the early years of international women's walking, placing in the top three globally in both the 5000 m and 10,000 m walks in 1982 and ranking second in the world in 1983.

International competitions

National titles
Soviet Athletics Championships
10 km road walk: 1983
Ukrainian Athletics Championships
10,000 m track walk: 1993

References

External links

Living people
1959 births
Ukrainian female racewalkers
Soviet female racewalkers
Universiade medalists in athletics (track and field)
Universiade bronze medalists for the Soviet Union